2001 is the seventh studio album by German rock band Tokio Hotel. It was released on November 18, 2022, worldwide. The album's name, the cover and the tracklist were revealed through YouTube Premium live on July 19, 2022. 2001 is the band's first studio album in nearly five years, following Dream Machine (2017), marking the longest gap between two Tokio Hotel studio albums.

Background 
Front singer Bill Kaulitz recalled in a statement that the lockdown gave the band time to be creative with each other again: "For the first time in a long time, it felt a bit like it did back then, more than 20 years ago,” says Kaulitz about the recording sessions.

This also explains the title of the new long player: "2001" is a reference to the year in which the band met and founded for the first time. According to Kaulitz “On the one hand, the album goes back to the roots, but it also combines all the Tokio Hotel facets of the last two decades,”

Title and artwork 
The album title, "2001", is a reference to the year the band first met.

Reception 
Critical response to the album was mixed. Take To News criticized the album stating "It seems a bit as if Tokio Hotel had given up." Frontstage Magazine however praised the album, calling it "Super danceable and super haunting".

Promotion 
Prior to the album's announcement, the band released the singles "Melancholic Paradise", "When It Rains It Pours" and "Chateau" in 2019, which despite not being included on the album served as promotional singles for a seventh album. A fourth single, "Berlin", along with the three aforementioned singles, was performed during Melancholic Paradise Tour 2019 prior to the song's release in 2020.

Personnel 

Tokio Hotel
 Bill Kaulitz
 Tom Kaulitz
 Georg Listing
 Gustav Schäfer

Additional personnel
 Vimalavong
 VitaliZe
 VVAVES
 ÁSDÍS
 Daði Freyr

Track listing

Charts

References 

2022 albums
Tokio Hotel albums